Jagua Pasto is a rural barrio in the municipality of Guayanilla, Puerto Rico. Its population in 2010 was 108.

Features and demographics
Jagua Pasto has  of land area and no water area.

History
Puerto Rico was ceded by Spain in the aftermath of the Spanish–American War under the terms of the Treaty of Paris of 1898 and became an unincorporated territory of the United States. In 1899, the United States Department of War conducted a census of Puerto Rico finding that the combined population of Quebrada Honda and Jagua Pasto barrios was 1,467.

See also

 List of communities in Puerto Rico

References

External links

Barrios of Guayanilla, Puerto Rico